Newmarket station may refer to:

 Newmarket GO Station in Ontario, Canada
 Newmarket railway station, Brisbane, in Queensland, Australia
 Newmarket railway station, Melbourne, in Victoria, Australia
 Newmarket railway station, Auckland, in Auckland, New Zealand
 Newmarket station (MBTA), in Boston, Massachusetts, USA
 Nieuwmarkt metro station in Amsterdam, Netherlands
 History of railway stations in Newmarket, Suffolk, UK:
 Newmarket (High Level) railway station, opened 1848 by the Newmarket and Chesterford Railway
 Newmarket Warren Hill railway station, opened 1885 by the Great Eastern Railway
 Newmarket railway station (Suffolk), opened 1902 by the Great Eastern Railway